The NRSP Microfinance Bank Ltd is the subsidiary of National Rural Support Programme which is an integrated rural development organization registered under company's ordinance 1984 with corporate law authority Islamabad. The NRSP Microfinance Bank headquarters is in South Punjab city of Bahawalpur.

It commenced its operations in March 2011. The bank is also privileged to be the 1st regulated provider of Islamic microfinance services in Pakistan.

Share Holders 

 National Rural Support Programme 57%
 International Finance Corporation 16%
 Acumen 11%
 PROPACRO 16%

See also
 Balochistan Rural Support Programme

References

External links
NRSP Microfinance Bank Limited
NRSP Official website
Institute of Rural Management Official Website

Non-profit organisations based in Pakistan
Banks established in 2011
Pakistani companies established in 2011
Microfinance banks in Pakistan